The  Quintola is one of several stringed instruments.

Violin Quintola

This type of Quintola is like a violin, but with 5 strings. It was developed by violin maker Victor Baston of Southall, United Kingdom in 1972.

Mandolin-Mandola hybrids

This type of Quintola is like a mandolin or mandola, but with either 5 single strings or 10 strings in 4 paired courses. It is usually tuned C-G-D-A-E, combining the tuning of both the mandolin and mandola. They will sometimes have fanned fretboards to accommodate this tuning.

Historical instruments

The name Quintola was also used historically to refer to the Gittern, along with the similar term Quintern. This instrument later evolved into the mandore and the mandolin.

Other types

There is also an instrument like the charango that uses the name Quintola.

References

Reference bibliography 

 
 http://stringedinstrumentdatabase.aornis.com/ Stringed Instrument Database

Mandolin family instruments
Chordophones